The Burmese flapshell turtle (Lissemys scutata), is a species in the family Trionychidae. The species is endemic to Asia.

Taxonomy
Some experts (M.A. Smith, 1931; Mertens, L. Müller & Rust, 1934) considered L. scutata to be a subspecies of L. punctata rather than its own species.

Description
L. scutata has an olive-brown to brown carapace with some dark spotting (in juveniles) or reticulations (in adults), and the first peripheral is smaller than the second. The head is olive to brown with an indistinct dark stripe extending backward from each orbit and another passing backward between the orbits.

Distribution and habitat
L. scutata lives in the Irrawaddy and Salween rivers of Myanmar, the vicinities of Bhamo, Pathein, Chauk, Yangon, Bago, and Mawlamyine in Myanmar, northeastern Thailand, and possibly in Yunnan Province, China (Kuchling, 1995).

Ecology and behavior

Diet 
The Burmese flapshell turtle is a piscivore.

Life cycle 
L. scutata reproduces sexually. It is oviparous.

Conservation 
Although the Burmese flapshell turtle is listed as Least Concern, some speculate it may be Vulnerable as it is traded in large numbers in East Asian food markets. However, not enough research has been done to come to a conclusion on this species' conservation status.

References

Further reading
Kuchling, Gerald (1995). "Turtles at a market in western Yunnan: Possible range extensions for some southern Asiatic chelonians in China and Myanmar". Chelonian Conserv. Biol. 1 (3): 223–226.
Peters W (1868). "Eine Mittheilung über eine neue Nagergattung, Chiropodomys pencillatus, so wie über einige neue oder weniger bekannte Amphibien und Fische ". Monatsberichte der Königlichen Akademie der Wissenschaften zu Berlin 1868: 448-461 + two plates. (Emyda scutata, new species, p. 449). (in German).
Smith MA (1931). The Fauna of British India, Including Ceylon and Burma. Reptilia and Amphibia. Vol. I.—Loricata, Testudines. London: Secretary of State for India in Council. (Taylor and Francis, printers). xxviii + 185 pp. + Plates I-II. (Lissemys punctata scutata, new combination, pp. 159–160 + Figure 34 on p. 155).
Webb RG (1982). "Taxonomic notes concerning the trionychid turtle Lissemys punctata (Lacepede)". Amphibia-Reptilia 3 (2-3): 179–184.

Lissemys
Reptiles of Myanmar
Reptiles of Thailand
Reptiles described in 1868
Taxa named by Wilhelm Peters